The Central Florida Tourism Oversight District (CFTOD), formerly the Reedy Creek Improvement District (RCID), is the governing jurisdiction and special taxing district for the land of Walt Disney World Resort. It includes  within the outer limits of Orange and Osceola counties in Florida. It acts with most of the same authority and responsibility as a county government. It includes the cities of Bay Lake and Lake Buena Vista, as well as unincorporated land.

The district was created in 1967 after the Florida Legislature passed the Reedy Creek Improvement Act. The law was pushed for by Walt Disney and his namesake media company both before and after Disney's death in 1966, during the planning stages of Walt Disney World.

The district has the authority of a governmental body, but was not subjected to the constraints of a governmental body until the Governor was granted authority to name Board members in 2023. A major selling point in lobbying the Florida Government to establish the district was Walt Disney's proposal of the "Experimental Prototype Community of Tomorrow" (EPCOT), a real planned community intended to serve as a testbed for new city-living innovations. The company however eventually decided to abandon Walt Disney's concepts for the experimental city, primarily only building a resort similar to its other parks.

In April 2022, the Florida Legislature passed a law abolishing the RCID along with special districts formed prior to November 5, 1968. Some members of the Florida Legislature as well as political commentators claimed the action was retaliation stemming from Disney's opposition to the controversial Parental Rights in Education Act, dubbed the "Don't Say Gay" bill by its critics. The law would have taken effect in June 2023, at which time the RCID would be dissolved; however, it was unclear what would happen to the $1 billion in bond liabilities held by the RCID. As a result, the state legislature reverted most of the changes on February 10, 2023, instead replacing the five-board members which were selected by Disney with a new board with five members appointed by the governor, along with removing parts of the district's authority, such as the power to potentially construct a nuclear power plant, airport, and stadium. The district's name would also be changed the day the bill was signed into law. This was approved by the Florida state legislature on February 9 and 10, 2023, and signed into law by Governor Ron DeSantis on February 27, 2023.

History

Creation

Initial steps

After the success of Disneyland in California, Walt Disney began planning a second park on the East Coast. He disliked the businesses that had sprung up around Disneyland, and wanted control of a much larger area of land for the new project. He flew over the Orlando-area site, and many other potential sites, in November 1963. Seeing the well-developed network of roads, including the planned Interstate 4 and Florida's Turnpike, with McCoy Air Force Base (later Orlando International Airport) to the east, he selected a centrally located site near Bay Lake. He used multiple shell companies to buy up land, at very low prices, that eventually would be included within the district. These company names are listed on the upper story windows of what is now the Main Street USA section of Walt Disney World, including Compass East Corporation; Latin-American Development and Management Corporation; Ayefour Corporation (named for nearby I-4); Tomahawk Properties, Incorporated; Reedy Creek Ranch, Incorporated; and Bay Lake Properties, Incorporated.

On March 11, 1966, these landowners, all fully owned subsidiaries of what is now The Walt Disney Company, petitioned the Circuit Court of the Ninth Judicial Circuit, which served Orange County, Florida, for the creation of the Reedy Creek Drainage District under Chapter 298 of the Florida Statutes. After a period during which some minor landowners within the boundaries opted out, the Drainage District was incorporated on May 13, 1966, as a public corporation. Among the powers of a Drainage District were the power to condemn and acquire property outside its boundaries "for the public use". It used this power at least once to obtain land for Canal C-1 (Bonnet Creek) through land that is now being developed as the Bonnet Creek Resort, a non-Disney resort.

Improvement district and cities
Walt Disney knew that his plans for the land would be easier to carry out with more independence. Among his ideas for his Florida project was his proposed EPCOT, the Experimental Prototype Community of Tomorrow, which was to be a futuristic planned city (and which was also known as Progress City). He envisioned a real working city with both commercial and residential areas, but one that also continued to showcase and test new ideas and concepts for urban living. Therefore, the Disney company petitioned the Florida State Legislature for the creation of the Reedy Creek Improvement District, which would have almost total autonomy within its borders. Residents of Orange and Osceola counties did not need to pay any taxes unless they were residents of the district. Services like land use regulation and planning, building codes, surface water control, drainage, waste treatment, utilities, roads, bridges, fire protection, emergency medical services, and environmental services were overseen by the district. The only areas where the district had to submit to the county and state would be property taxes and elevator inspections. The planned EPCOT city was also emphasized in this lobbying effort.

On May 12, 1967, Governor Claude R. Kirk Jr. signed the Reedy Creek Improvement Act, adding the following Florida statutes to implement Disney's plans:

 Chapter 67-764 created the Reedy Creek Improvement District;
 Chapter 67-1104 established the City of Bay Lake; and
 Chapter 67-1965 established the City of Reedy Creek (later renamed as the City of Lake Buena Vista around 1970.)

According to a press conference held in Winter Park, Florida on February 2, 1967 by Disney Vice President Donn Tatum, the Improvement District and Cities were created to serve "the needs of those residing there", because the company needed its own government to "clarify the District's authority to [provide services] within the District's limits", and because of the public nature of the planned development. The original city boundaries did not cover the whole Improvement District; they may have been intended as the areas where communities would be built for residential use. To maintain full control of the district, it was important for Disney to limit the voting rights of the inhabitants, rights which were only meant to include landowners owning more than one-half acre. Since Disney owned most of the land, the residents would simply be renting their homes. But after the 1968 Avery v. Midland County case, Disney feared that they would have to eventually give everyone living inside the district voting rights, and so the population was restricted to the two municipalities Bay Lake and Lake Buena Vista.

Further development
In 1993, the land that eventually became the Disney-controlled town of Celebration, Florida—which was built with many of Walt Disney's original ideas that had since evolved into a form of New Urbanism—was deannexed from Bay Lake and the District. This was done to keep its residents from having power over Disney by providing for separate administration of the areas. Celebration lies on unincorporated land within Osceola County, with a thin strip of still-incorporated land separating it from the rest of the county. This strip of land contains canals and other land used by the District.

The Reedy Creek Improvement Act was held by the Supreme Court of Florida not to violate any provision of the state constitution. As the law, in part, declares that the District is exempt from all state land use regulation laws "now or hereafter enacted," the Attorney General of Florida has issued an opinion stating that this includes state requirements for developments of regional impact (DRIs).

After Walt Disney died in 1966, the Disney company board decided that it did not want to be in the business of running a city, and abandoned many of his ideas for Progress City. The planned residential areas were never built. Richard Foglesong argues in his book, Married to the Mouse: Walt Disney World and Orlando, that Disney has abused its powers by remaining in complete control of the District.

In January 1990, the RCID was granted a $57-million allocation of tax-free state bonds over an agency with plans for a low-income housing development and all additional government applicants in a six-county region, as the state distributed the bond proceeds on a first-come order. Disney was criticized for the move, with a Republican gubernatorial candidate filing a lawsuit to stop the RCID from using the funds. Also, one state legislator moved to limit the RCID's ability to apply for the program.

Abolition
On March 30, 2022, State Representative Spencer Roach tweeted that Florida legislators had met twice within the past week to discuss the possibility of repealing the Reedy Creek Improvement Act and stripping Disney of its "special privileges" in the state. Roach and Florida governor Ron DeSantis later criticized Disney for the "special perks" the company enjoyed through use of the RCID. Roach said there had been previous attempts to eliminate the district. A bill analysis and fiscal impact statement for the bill was created on April 19, 2022 by Senator Jennifer Bradley. However, this analysis was unable to determine the impact the bill would have on either the residents served by the special district, or the local governments that would absorb the district's debts.

On April 20, 2022, the Florida Senate passed Senate Bill 4C (SB 4C) with a 23–16 vote that would abolish the special taxing district. If it became law, the bill would dissolve any independent special district in Florida established prior to November 5, 1968, including the RCID; the dissolution would take effect June 1, 2023. On April 21, 2022, the bill was passed by the Florida House by a 70–38 vote. DeSantis signed the bill into law the following day. Some members of the Florida Legislature as well as political commentators said the bill was likely retaliation for Disney announcing its opposition to the Parental Rights in Education Act, dubbed by critics as the "Don't Say Gay bill". Representative Dotie Joseph dubbed SB 4C "un-American" adding that it was "[p]unishing a company for daring to speak against a governor's radical-right political agenda". 

On May 16, 2022, Florida Governor Ron DeSantis said that he is looking into making the government take control of the special district but promised that local and state tax payers would not be paying for Reedy Creek's outstanding debt.

In 2023 DeSantis announced he would rename the district to Central Florida Tourism Oversight District instead of dissolving it, and replace five-board members which has been selected by Disney, with a new board with five members hand-picked by the governor. This was approved by the Florida state legislature on February 9 and 10, 2023. Under those changes, the district will be renamed to the Central Florida Tourism Oversight District. The bill was signed by Governor Ron DeSantis on February 27.

Potential repercussions 
The bill was passed after two days of discussions and without a fiscal impact analysis. This led to debates about the bill's effects on taxes and bond debt. Randy Fine, the Republican House sponsor of the bill, claimed a different type of district could be formed that would not move additional costs to taxpayers.

Disney already pays property taxes to Orange and Osceola counties. The bill would not increase these counties' revenues but would force both counties to increase services within the former jurisdiction of the RCID. A tax collector for Orange County claimed the RCID's abolition would increase costs for taxpayers. Florida Senate Democratic member Gary Farmer also highlighted concerns that the dissolution would transfer over $1 billion in bond liabilities to all Florida taxpayers.

Potential legal challenges 
Analysts expected legal challenges to the dissolution.  One argument was that because the law targeted Disney in retaliation for a political position, it violated the company's free speech rights under the First Amendment to the United States Constitution.

Another argument is that the dissolution violates the contract the state of Florida made with bondholders not to alter or limit the powers of the district until all bonds were paid off, making the dissolution unconstitutional under the Contract Clause.  Under Florida law, when a special district government, like the Reedy Creek Improvement District, is dissolved, the dissolution transfers "title to all property owned by the preexisting special district government to the local general-purpose government, which shall also assume all indebtedness of the preexisting special district."  In 1866, the U.S. Supreme Court ruled that "once a local government issues a bond based on an authorized taxing power, the state is contract-bound and cannot eliminate the taxing power supporting the bond".

Local taxpayers did file suit in federal court, but this was dismissed in May 2022 for lack of standing for the First Amendment issue, and lack of demonstrated injury to the taxpayers. It was refiled in state court the same month.

Abolition reversal 
On December 2, 2022, Financial Times reported that a deal between Representative Randy Fine, the Disney company and other members of the Florida state legislature was underway to keep the main Reedy Creek Improvement District agreement, since the District abolition law is yet to take effect. Such compromise was reportedly being drafted especially because former Disney CEO Bob Chapek, who openly opposed the Parental Rights in Education law, was fired, and the abolition of the District would represent a tax increase in cities and counties across Florida, which could endanger governor Ron DeSantis' nomination for the Republican Party in the 2024 presidential election. 

Ultimately, concerns over possible debt transfer to counties and taxpayers in Orange and Osceola Counties having to start paying for some Disney World services such as police, fire protection and road maintenance, led the legislature to mostly revert the changes. On February 9 and 10, 2023, the Florida State House and Senate, respectively, passed bills in a special session allowing the special tax district to remain, as well as leaving the ability for Disney to issue tax-exempt bonds and approve development plans without scrutiny from certain local regulators in place. However, Disney would no longer be able to appoint the five members of the tax district's board, which would instead be appointed by the Governor, and some parts of the district's authority would be removed, such as the power to potentially construct a nuclear power plant, airport, and stadium. Governor DeSantis signed the bill on February 27.

Geography

Reedy Creek is a natural waterway whose flow, drainage, and destination have been altered over the years by human development. It begins west of the Bay Lake city limits and the Magic Kingdom, and then meanders south through Disney property, passing between Disney's Animal Kingdom and Blizzard Beach. It crosses Interstate 4 and exits Disney property west of Celebration and runs mostly through undeveloped territory east of Haines City. It empties into Lake Russell, and continues flowing southward into Cypress Lake, which is connected to the Kissimmee Chain of Lakes.

Governance 

The district is governed by a five-member Board of Supervisors. Each supervisor is appointed by the Governor of Florida and confirmed by the Florida Senate. Supervisors serve for terms of four years, and may serve for up to three consecutive terms. Any individual currently or within the past three years employed by a theme park or entertainment company is prohibited from serving as a supervisor. The members appointed to the board following changes to the district in 2023, subject to Senate confirmation, are as follows:

 Martin Garcia (chair)
 Bridget Ziegler
 Michael Sasso
 Brian Aungst, Jr.
 Ron Peri
Controversy arose after the nominations, as all five proposed members are allies of Ron DeSantis, have donated to his political campaigns, or are active in other right-wing circles. Ziegler founded Moms for Liberty, a conservative group promoting "anti-woke" school policies and board members, and was a primary proponent of the Parental Rights in Education Act (also known as the "Don't Say Gay" bill). Her husband was elected to lead the Republican Party of Florida shortly before the governance changes to the district went into effect. Martin Garcia, the proposed new chairperson of the Board, donated $50,000 to DeSantis' political action committee, and according to Forbes, "was also named in court testimony as having been consulted when DeSantis' administration was preparing to suspend local prosecutor Andrew Warren for espousing pro-abortion rights views". Ron Peri runs The Gathering USA, a conservative Christian ministry for men in Florida, and previously claimed "estrogen in the water from birth control pills" has contributed to a rise in homosexuality, and has called homosexuality "shameful", "deviant", and that it was a cause of decline for the Roman Empire. Michael Sasso runs the Orlando chapter of the conservative Federalist Society, and Brian Aungst Jr. is a conservative Pinellas County attorney previously appointed to the 6th Circuit judicial nominating commission.

Former governance structure 
Prior to the passage of H-B 9, the Board of Supervisors were elected by the landowners of the District on a one-acre-per-vote basis. As the majority landowner in Reedy Creek, The Walt Disney Company essentially handpicked the members of the Board. Under this model, each member owned an undeveloped  lot of land within the District—the only land in the District not technically controlled by Disney or used for public road purposes.

The District headquarters are in a building in Lake Buena Vista, east of Disney Springs. The District runs the following services, primarily serving Disney:

 Law enforcement – Officers from Orange County, Osceola County and the Florida Highway Patrol are contracted to police the district. In addition, the Walt Disney Company employs about 800 security staff in their Disney Safety and Security division. While Disney security maintains a fleet of private security Chevrolet Equinoxes equipped with flashing amber and green lights, flares, traffic cones, and chalk commonly used by police officers, arrests and citations are issued by the Florida Highway Patrol along with the Orange County and Osceola County sheriffs deputies.Disney security personnel are involved with traffic control and may only issue personnel violation notices to Disney and RCID employees, not the general public. Security vans previously had red lightbars, but after public scrutiny following the death of Robb Sipkema, were changed to amber to fall in line with Florida State Statutes.
 Environmental protection: Many pieces of land have been donated to the Florida Department of Environmental Regulation and the South Florida Water Management District as conservation easements, and the District collects data and ensures that large portions remain in their natural wetland state.
 Building codes and land-use planning – The "EPCOT Building Codes" were implemented to provide the sort of flexibility that the innovative community of EPCOT would require. The provisions contained therein, although rumored to be exceptionally stringent, have in fact never been far and above those of the Standard Building Code or the Florida Building Code (FBC) that is currently in force in the rest of Florida. In fact, since the inception of the International Building Code (IBC) in 2000, the EPCOT Building Code defers much of its design parameters to the IBC-based FBC, and many of the reference standards contained therein. Particularly with regard to wind design, today's standards are better than the ones that previously existed, and today's RCID buildings are built to withstand  winds. Hurricane Charley (2004) reached maximum sustained winds estimated  at the nearby Orlando International Airport but winds were lower on RCID property. Although the codes are ostensibly updated on a three-year cycle, the most recent and currently used version of the EPCOT Building Codes is the 2018 version.
 Utilities – wastewater treatment and collection, water reclamation, electric generation and distribution, solid waste disposal, potable water, natural gas distribution, and hot and chilled water distribution are managed through Reedy Creek Energy Services, which has been merged with the Walt Disney World Company
 Roads – Many of the main roads in the District are public roads maintained by the District, while minor roads and roads dead-ending at attractions are private roads maintained by Disney; in addition, state-maintained Interstate 4 and U.S. Highway 192 pass through the District, as does part of the right-of-way of County Road 535 (formerly State Road 535).

Disney provides transportation for guests and employees in the form of buses, ferries, and monorails, under the name Disney Transport. In addition, several Lynx public bus routes enter the District, with half-hour service between the Transportation and Ticket Center (and backstage areas at the Magic Kingdom) and Downtown Orlando and Kissimmee, and once-a-day service to more points, intended mainly for cleaning staff. Half-hourly service is provided, via Lynx, to Orlando International Airport (MCO).

Fire department

The Reedy Creek Fire Department (RCFD) was created in 1968 to provide fire suppression for RCID. Today, RCFD provides fire suppression, emergency medical services, 911 communications, fire inspections, technical rescue services, and hazardous materials mitigation. EMS makes up approximately 85 percent of the call volume, with RCFD providing both Advanced Life Support and Basic Life Support.

RCFD currently staffs four fire stations located throughout the district with 138 personnel across three shifts. They also maintain a staff of 86 administrative and support personnel including EMS team members (primarily located in each of the four Walt Disney World theme parks), 911 communicators, and fire inspectors among others. There are four engines, two-tower trucks, one squad unit, eight rescue ambulances and several special units.

See also
 Walt Disney World Company
 Bonnet Creek Resort
 Company town

References

Further reading 
 Richard Foglesong (2001), Married to the Mouse: Walt Disney World and Orlando, Yale University Press, 
 Sam Gennawey (2011), Walt Disney and the Promise of Progress City, Theme Park Press, 
 Aaron H. Goldberg (2021), "Buying Disney's World: The Story of How Florida Swampland Became Walt Disney World", Quaker Scribe,

External links 
 Reedy Creek Improvement District

 
Greater Orlando
Quasi-public entities in the United States
Special districts of Florida
States and territories established in 1967
Walt Disney World
Unincorporated communities in Orange County, Florida
Unincorporated communities in Osceola County, Florida
1967 establishments in Florida
Unincorporated communities in Florida